Thomas L. Sindlinger (born September 2, 1941) is a politician in Alberta, Canada, and former member of the Legislative Assembly of Alberta. He was born in Camrose, Alberta.

Tom Sindlinger was elected as a member for the district of Calgary-Buffalo in the 1979 for the Progressive Conservatives. He disagreed with his party on matters relating to the Heritage Trust Fund and freedom of information. He was subsequently pressured to leave the P.C. legislature caucus. In 1981 he sat as an Independent Conservative, until he founded the Alberta Reform Movement.

He led the newly formed Alberta Reform Movement into the 1982 Alberta election. The party did not do well, as it was still at a very early stage of formation, without the resources to fight a snap election, and had to compete against a number of other right wing parties. Sindlinger ended up losing his seat in a second-place result.

More recently Sindlinger has been promoting Senate Reform, he ran as an independent senator-in-waiting candidate in both the 1989 and 2004 elections.

Aside from his political career, his private business is travelling around the world economic consulting for private companies and government projects. He was also inducted into the Lethbridge Sports Hall of Fame. He has a bachelor's and master's degree of Business and Economics.

References

External links
Tom Sindlinger's home page
Profiles of Senator in Waiting candidates. Airdrie Echo

1941 births
Living people
Progressive Conservative Association of Alberta MLAs
Independent Alberta MLAs